Jimmy Bulus (born October 22, 1986 in Kaduna, Nigeria) is a Nigerien football player who played for the Niger national football team.

Career
Jimmy Bulus started his career in JS du Ténéré in Niger and went on to ASFA Yennenga in the Burkinabé Premier League.

International career
He was a member of Niger national football team, for which he plays from 2003. He played in the 2012 African Nations Cup, mostly on right back position.

References

External links 

1986 births
Living people
Sportspeople from Kaduna
Nigerian emigrants to Niger
Nigerien footballers
Niger international footballers
2011 African Nations Championship players
2012 Africa Cup of Nations players
Association football forwards
ASFA Yennenga players
NA Hussein Dey players
AS FAN players
Dhofar Club players
US GN players
Super Ligue (Niger) players
Burkinabé Premier League players
Algerian Ligue Professionnelle 1 players
Oman Professional League players
Expatriate footballers in Burkina Faso
Nigerien expatriate sportspeople in Burkina Faso
Expatriate footballers in Algeria
Nigerien expatriate sportspeople in Algeria
Expatriate footballers in Oman
Nigerien expatriate sportspeople in Oman
Niger A' international footballers